Andriana was both the noble class and a title of nobility in Madagascar. Historically, many Malagasy ethnic groups lived in highly stratified caste-based social orders in which the andriana were the highest strata. They were above the Hova (free commoner castes) and Andevo (slaves). The Andriana and the Hova were a part of Fotsy, while the Andevo were Mainty in local terminology.

The Andriana strata originally constituted the nobility, warrior, and land owning class of the Merina society. They were endogamous and their privileges were institutionally preserved. While the term and concept of Andriana is studied with the Merina people of Madagascar, the term is not limited to them. The use of the word "Andriana" to denote nobility occurs among numerous other Malagasy ethnic groups such as the Betsileo, the Betsimisaraka, the Tsimihety, the Bezanozano, the Antambahoaka and the Antemoro.  Andriana often traditionally formed part of the names of Malagasy kings, princes, and nobles. Linguistic evidence suggests its origin is traceable back to an ancient Javanese nobility title, although alternate theories have been proposed.

Etymology

According to K.A. Adelaar, the Malagasy title "andriana" probably originated from the ancient Java-Indonesian nobility title Rahadyan (Ra-hady-an), "hady" meaning "Lord" or "Master." In Malagasy the term became Rohandryan and later Roandriana, mainly used in the Southeastern part of the island among the Zafiraminia, Antemoro and Antambahoaka ethnic groups. In the central Highlands among the Merina, Betsileo, Bezanozano, and Sihanaka, the term became Randryan and later Randriana or simply Andriana.

Other proposed etymology for Andriana includes the root Handrina which means "head or forehead" in Malagasy.

In Madagascar, the name of a Malagasy sovereign, prince or nobleman was often historically composed by placing "Andriana" as a prefix to the remainder of the name.  For example, the name of Merina king Andrianampoinimerina is a composite of "Andriana" and "Nampoinimerina", while that of the celebrated Sakalava warrior Andriamisara is formed from "Andriana" and "Misara".

In Madagascar today, names beginning with the "Andria" prefix are common.  However, unlike in Western cultures where children automatically inherit the family name of a parent, Malagasy parents are free to choose their child's first and last name as they please.  Following the end of the monarchy in Imerina, many parents have chosen to give their children names including the "Andriana" prefix, despite lacking any family connection to the former aristocracy.

History
Austronesian people started settling in Madagascar between 200 and 500 CE. They arrived by boats and were from various southeast Asian groups. Mainland Africans began migrating to the island by the 9th century. The Portuguese traders were the first Europeans to arrive in the 15th century, followed by other European powers.

This influx of diverse people led to various Malagasy sub-ethnicities in the mid-2nd millennium. The Merina were probably the early arrivals, though this is uncertain and other ethnic groups on Madagascar consider them relative newcomers to the island. The Merina people's culture likely mixed and merged with the Madagascar natives named Vazimba about whom little is known. According to the island's oral traditions, the "most Austronesian looking" Merina people reached the interior of the island in the 15th century and established their society there because of wars and migrant pressure at the coast. Merina people were settled in the central Madagascar, formed one of the three major kingdoms on the island by the 18th century – the other two being Swahili-Arab influenced Sakalava kingdom on the west-northwest and Austronesian Betsimisaraka kingdom on the east-northeast.

The term Hova originally applied to all members of the Merina people who arrived in the central highlands around the 15th century and absorbed the existing population of Vazimba. Andriamanelo (1540–1575) consolidated the power of the Hova when he united many of the Hova chiefdoms around Antananarivo under his rule. The term Hova remained in use through the 20th century, though some foreigners transliterated that word to be Ankova, and increasingly used since the 19th century.

In and after the 16th century, slaves were brought into Madagascar's various kingdoms, and social strata emerged in Merina kingdom. The Hova emerged as the free commoners caste below the nobles hierarchy. During the rule of King Andriamanelo, a subset of Hova related to the king by blood came under the title Andriana. The social structure of the new kingdom became further defined under his son Ralambo (1575–1612), who further subdivided the Andriana into four ranks, and eventually six sub-castes by King Andriamasinavalona (1675–1710).

Sub-castes among the Merina
King Andriamanelo (1540–1575) is credited with establishing the Andriana as a separate class in early Merina society.  This class was sub-divided into four groups by his son, the King Ralambo (1575–1600):

 Andriantompokoindrindra, the Eldest son of the King Ralambo and his direct descendants,
 Andrianamboninolona, the son of Andriamananitany, brother of the King Andriamanelo, and his direct descendants.
 Andriandranando, the uncle of the King Ralambo and his direct descendants.
 Zanadralambo amin'Andrianjaka, the other sons of the King Ralambo.
The descendants of these three princes (Andriantompokoindrindra, Andrianamboninolona and Andriandranando) was called Andrianteloray.

And further it was divided into six groups by Ralambo's great-great-grandson King Andriamasinavalona (1675–1710) based on locality and genealogical proximity to the ruling family. The andriana class was divided again into seven groups by King Andrianampoinimerina (1778-1810). In rank order, these groups are:

 Zazamarolahy (or Marolahy): Direct male descendants of the sovereign. It is among the small, elite sub-group of these called the Zanakandriana that the next ruler was selected.
 Andriamasinavalona: Noble descendants of the four sons of King Andriamasinavalona who were not assigned to rule one of the four sub-divisions of Imerina that had been made the fiefs of his other four sons.
 Andriantompokoindrindra: Descendants of Andriantompokoindrindra, the eldest son of King Ralambo.
 Andrianamboninolona ("Princes Above the People") or Zanakambony ("Sons Above"): Descendants of those who accompanied King Andrianjaka on his conquest of Antananarivo.
 Andriandranando (or Zafinandriandranando): Descendants of the uncle of King Ralambo.
 Zanadralambo amin'Andrianjaka: Descendants of Ralambo's other children who did not accede to the throne.

Occupations and privileges 
The Andriana caste were originally the source of nobility and they specialized in the rituals and warrior occupations in the Merina society. However, in 19th century when Merina conquered the other kingdoms and ruled most of the island, a much larger army was needed, and the soldiers then included the Hova caste as well.

The Andriana benefited from numerous privileges in precolonial Madagascar.  Land ownership in Imerina was reserved for the andriana class, who ruled over fiefs called menakely.  The populace under the rule of an andriana lord owed him—and the king—a certain amount of free labor each year (fanompoana) for public works such as the construction of dikes, rice paddies, roads and town walls. Posts of privilege within the government, such as judges or royal advisers, were likewise reserved for certain groups of andriana.

The valiha, the national instrument of Madagascar, was originally an instrument of the masses but came to be affiliated with the noble class in the 19th century. The valiha featured heavily in the music of the Merina royal court performed at palaces such as Ambohimanga or the Rova at Antananarivo. The strings of the valiha were more easily plucked with the fingernails, which were commonly grown long for this purpose; long fingernails became fashionable and symbolic of belonging to the andriana class within the Kingdom of Imerina.

At Antananarivo, only andriana tombs were allowed to be constructed within town limits. Hovas (freemen) and slaves were required to bury their dead beyond the city walls.  The highest ranks of andriana were permitted to distinguish their tombs by the construction of a small, windowless wooden tomb house on top of it, called a trano masina (sacred house) for the king and trano manara (cold house) for the Zanakandriana, Zazamarolahy and Andriamasinavalona. This tradition may have originated with King Andriantompokoindrindra, who is said to have ordered the first trano masina to be built on his tomb in honor of his memory.

Marriage
Andriana were also subjected to certain restrictions.  Marriage outside the caste was forbidden by law among the lowest three ranks of andriana. A high-ranking woman who married a lower-ranking man would take on her husband's lower rank. Although the inverse situation would not cause a high-ranking man to lose status, he would be unable to transfer his rank or property to his children. For these reasons, intermarriage across andriana caste divisions was relatively infrequent.

The Andriana, the Hova and the Andevo strata were endogamous in the Merina society. According to the colonial era missionary William Ellis memoir in 1838, an Andriana in the Malagasy society was prohibited from marrying a Hova or an Andevo. The exception, stated Ellis, was the unmarried Queen who could marry anyone from any strata including the Hova, and her children were deemed to be royal. In contrast, Sandra Evers states that the social taboo on inter marriage was weaker between the Andriana and Hova, but strong against that between Andriana and Andevo. The social mores and restrictions on inter-marriage between social strata were historically present among other Malagasy ethnic groups.

Contemporary society
The Andriana, along with the other castes, played an important part in the independence of Madagascar. For instance, Joseph Ravoahangy-Andrianavalona, a Merina nationalist and deputy, was andriana of the Andriamasinavalona sub-caste. The secret nationalist organization V.V.S. (Vy Vato Sakelika) was composed of some Andriana of the intelligentsia. A 1968 study showed that 14% of the population of Imerina was Andriana.

The andriana have been key players in Madagascan political and cultural life after independence as well. The andriana were deeply affected by the 1995 destruction of the royal palace, the Rova, in Antananarivo, and their approval and participation were periodically solicited throughout the reconstruction process.

In 2011, the Council of Kings and Princes of Madagascar promoted the revival of a Christian andriana monarchy that would blend modernity and tradition.

In 2016, the London School of Economics enrolled their first Andriana, making them the first Malagasy royal to join the ranks of LSE's famous alumnus. It has been reported that they are directly descended from Queen Rabodozafimanjaka, who is the wife of King Andrianampoinimerina and daughter of King Andriantsimitoviaminandriana who ruled the Merina Kingdom.

Genealogy: Tantara ny Andriana 
Much of the known genealogical history of the Andriana of Imerina comes from Father François Callet's book Tantara ny Andriana eto Madagasikara ("History of the Nobles"). This collection of oral tradition about the history of the Merina Dynasty was originally written in Malagasy and published between 1878 and 1881. Callet summarized and translated it in French under the title  "Tantara ny Andriana (Histoire des rois)" in 1908. Tantara ny Andriana constitutes the core material for the historians studying the Merina history, and has been commented, criticised, and challenged ever since by historians from Madagascar, Europe, and North America.  For examples, refer to Rasamimanana (1930), Ravelojaona et al. (1937), Ramilison (1951), Kent (1970), Berg (1988) or Larson (2000). The work is complemented by oral traditions of other tribes collected by Malagasy historians.

Andriana gallery

See also

History of Madagascar
History of the Merinas
History of the Betsileos
History of the Sakalavas
List of Malagasy monarchs

References

Bibliography

Rabarioelina, Ndriana (Rev. Dr.) (2010), "Biblical Relations between Israel and Madagascar", Doctoral Thesis of Theology, SAHTS, États-Unis, 2010, 458 pages. Abstract in Saint-Alcuin House Journal, Volume 8, N°1, USA, 2011. And in Library of Congress, number ISSN 1548-4459, USA.
Charlotte Liliane Rabesahala-Randriamananoro, Ambohimanga-Rova : approche anthropologique de la civilisation merina (Madagascar), Paris, Le Publieur, 2006, 393 p. . Texte remanié d’une thèse soutenue à l’Université de La Réunion en 2002. 
Rajaonarimanana, Narivelo (1990), Savoirs arabico-malgaches : la tradition manuscrite des devins Antemoro Anakara (Madagascar), Institut national des langues et civilisations orientales. 
Ramamonjy, Georges (1952), "De quelques attitudes et coutumes merina", dans Mémoires de l'Institut scientifique de Madagascar (Tananarive), série C, Sciences humaines, 1 (2), 1952, p. 181-196. 
Ramilison, Emmanuel (Pastor) (1951), Andriantomara-Andriamamilazabe. Loharanon' ny Andriana nanjaka eto Imerina, Imprimerie Ankehitriny. 
Randrianja Solofo, Ellis Stephen (2009), Madagascar. A short history, London, Hurst & Company, 2009.
Raombana (l'historien) (1809-1855), "Histoires", Edition Ambozontany, Fianarantsoa, 3 Volumes. 
Rasamimanana, Joseph (Dr.) (1909) et Louis de Gonzague Razafindrazaka (Governor), Ny Andriantompokoindrindra, Antananarivo, 50 pages. 
Ravelojaona (Pastor) (1937-1970), Firaketana ny Fiteny sy ny Zavatra Malagasy, Encyclopedic Dictionary, Antananarivo, 5 Volumes. 
Razafindrazaka, Harilanto, et alii (2009) "A new deep branch of eurasian mtDNA macrohaplogroup M reveals additional complexity regarding the settlement of Madagascar", BMC Genomics.
Rombaka, Jacques Philippe (1963), Tantaran-drazana Antemoro-Anteony, Antananarivo, Imprimerie LMS, pp. 10–11. 
Rombaka, Jacques Philippe (1970), Fomban-drazana Antemoro - usages et coutumes antemoro, Ambozontany, Fianarantsoa, 121 p. 
 Ratsivalaka, Ranaivo Gilbert (Gal) (1995): "Madagascar dans le Sud-Ouest de l’Océan Indien", Thèse de Doctorat d’Etat en Histoire-Paris, Antananarivo, 1995, 1083 p. 
 Grandidier, Alfred et Guillaume (1903-1958): "Histoire de Madagascar", 39 volumes, Paris, 1903-1958.

External links
 The Merina Nation
 A Historical Timeline for Madagascar
 Royal House of Madagascar

Social classes
Royal titles
Noble titles
African nobility
Castes
History of Madagascar
Malagasy culture
Society of Madagascar
Former monarchies of Africa
Former countries in Africa